Presidential elections were held in Liberia in May 1871. Former president Joseph Jenkins Roberts of the Republican Party was elected unopposed. Roberts took office on 1 January 1872.

References

Liberia
1871 in Liberia
Elections in Liberia
May 1871 events
Election and referendum articles with incomplete results